The Parque de Béisbol Centenario del 27 de Febrero is a stadium in Villahermosa, Mexico.  It is primarily used for baseball and serves as the home stadium for the Olmecas de Tabasco.  The stadium has a capacity of 6,600 people  and is named in honor of the Battle of San Juan Bautista, which was fought nearby.

References 

1964 establishments in Mexico
Sports venues completed in 1964
Sports venues in Tabasco
Estadio Centenario 27 de Febrero
Mexican League ballparks